The Men's shot put event at the 2011 World Championships in Athletics was held at the Daegu Stadium on September 1 and 2.

David Storl made a major improvement to achieve a new personal best of 21.50, leading the qualifying round by 45 cm (a foot and a half).

2007 Champion, Reese Hoffa, took the early lead and held it until Storl threw a new personal best of 21.60 in the second round. Andrei Mikhnevich put a 21.40 in the third round to get close to Storl. In the fourth round, world leader, Dylan Armstrong, took the lead with a 21.64, which held up as the leader until the final throw of the competition, when Storl threw a third personal best of 21.78 to win.

In 2013, it was revealed that Andrei Mikhnevich tested positive for a prohibited substance at the 2005 World Championships. Since this was his second offense, he was given a lifetime ban and all his results from August 2005 and on were annulled.

Medalists

Records
Prior to the competition, the established records were as follows.

Qualification standards

Schedule

Results

Qualification
Qualification: Qualifying Performance 20.60 (Q) or at least 12 best performers (q) advance to the final.

Final

References

External links
Shot put results at IAAF website

Shot put
Shot put at the World Athletics Championships